Steinar Dagur Adolfsson (born 25 January 1970) is a retired Icelandic football defender.

In his early career he played for Valur, KR Reykjavik and ÍA Akranes. He joined Kongsvinger IL in 1999, and played semi-regularly the first two seasons. He left after the 2001 season.

He was extensively capped for Iceland on youth level, especially U18 and U21, and was subsequently capped 14 times and scored 1 goal for Iceland.

References

1970 births
Living people
Steinar Dagur Adolfsson
Steinar Dagur Adolfsson
Steinar Dagur Adolfsson
Steinar Dagur Adolfsson
Steinar Dagur Adolfsson
Steinar Dagur Adolfsson
Steinar Dagur Adolfsson
Steinar Dagur Adolfsson
Steinar Dagur Adolfsson
Expatriate footballers in Norway
Kongsvinger IL Toppfotball players
Eliteserien players
Norwegian First Division players
Association football defenders